The World-Spectator is a weekly newspaper in the Canadian province of Saskatchewan, serving the communities of Moosomin, Rocanville, Esterhazy, Redvers, Wapella, Wawota, Langbank, Welwyn, Spy Hill, Tantallon, Fleming, Fairlight and Maryfield. It also serves the Manitoba communities of St. Lazare, McAuley, Manson, Elkhorn, and Kola.

The newspaper's history dates back to October 2, 1884, when the first issue was published. The newspaper published daily editions for a short time during the North-West Rebellion in 1885.

The World-Spectator has won more awards than any other Saskatchewan newspaper, including twice winning the B'nai B'rith League For Human Rights National Media Award and doing an award-winning investigation into the history of the Ku Klux Klan in Saskatchewan, and international development. Its editor, Kevin Weedmark, has reported on international development issues from Afghanistan, Vietnam and the Philippines. Reporter Amanda Stephenson won the Canadian International Development Agency's Award for Excellence in Writing on International Co-operation for 2006 while a reporter with The World-Spectator, and travelled to Mozambique to report on development projects in that country.

In 2004, World-Spectator reporter Kara Kinna published an article in the newspaper on the testing of mustard gas on soldiers at CFB Suffield during World War II. The article was reprinted in Postmedia newspapers in several Canadian cities, and other media followed up with their own investigations, articles, and broadcasts. The ombudsman for the Canadian Armed Forces investigated the claims and cited Kinna's original article in his report to Parliament. The Canadian government then compensated all of the soldiers who had been used for testing of chemical weapons.

In 2010, investigative reporting by The World-Spectator on the Sun Country Health Region led to the resignation of Sun Country vice-president of finance Hal Schmidt after The World-Spectator reported that Schmidt had been fired from a previous job as CEO of IWK Health Centre in Halifax, Nova Scotia, for falsely claiming to have earned his chartered accountant designation, and that Schmidt had borrowed $75,000 in public funds from St. Mary's Health Centre in New Westminster, British Columbia and failed to repay the loan. Based on Weedmark's reporting, the provincial health ministry investigated hiring practices in the Sun Country Health Region, and CEO Cal Tant was fired by the board the day it received the report.

The newspaper has a long history of community service. The newspaper won Community Service Awards from the Saskatchewan Weekly Newspapers Association and the Canadian Community Newspapers Association in 2006, and in 2007 was given the Community Recognition Award by the Moosomin Chamber of Commerce.

See also
List of newspapers in Canada

References

External links
 

Weekly newspapers published in Saskatchewan